The Iowa–Iowa State football rivalry is an American college football rivalry game between the Iowa State Cyclones and Iowa Hawkeyes.  The Cy-Hawk Trophy is awarded to the winner of the game. It is named after the teams' mascots, Cy the Cardinal and Herky the Hawk.
Conceived and created as a traveling trophy by the Greater Des Moines Athletic Club in 1976, the trophy was first presented to the winner by Iowa Governor Robert D. Ray in 1977. That game was the first meeting between the two since 1934. In the entire history of the rivalry, the game has never been contested anywhere beside Iowa City or Ames and alternates between the two respective campuses. Games in odd-numbered years are played in Ames at Iowa State University, and even-numbered years in Iowa City at The University of Iowa.

Trophy design
The trophy design used through the 2010 season featured a football, a running back in the classic stiff-arm pose, and the likenesses of Iowa State's Cy the Cardinal and Iowa's Herky the Hawk. The trophy was replaced after the 2010 game, making it the only rivalry trophy with a sponsor attached to it. Since then the Cy-Hawk trophy makes an annual tour with WHO sportscaster Keith Murphy the week before the game. It remains the recognizable symbol of the contest and, according to Murphy, "people love it." 

A new trophy, donated by the Iowa Corn Growers Association, was introduced to the public during the Iowa State Fair on August 19, 2011. A sculpture atop the new trophy depicted a farm family with small children huddled about a bushel basket of corn. Dean Taylor, president of the Association, called it "a work of art that represents Iowans and their hard work." Within hours of its presentation, however, the new trophy was widely ridiculed in newspaper columns and internet postings by the public. Iowa Governor Terry Branstad publicly provided negative feedback, as did retired Iowa football coach Hayden Fry, who said, "The farmer, family and corn is all wonderful, but I don't really get the relationship to a football game."

On August 23, 2011, Iowa Corn Growers Association CEO Craig Floss announced that the new Cy-Hawk Trophy would be changed as a result of the negative public reaction. Selection of the new trophy would involve public input. A temporary trophy was used for 2011.

With fan input, the newly redesigned trophy was unveiled at the end of the 2012 game won by Iowa State featuring mascots of the two universities, a raised football, and corn making up the  background.

Game results
The two schools played each other 24 times between 1894 and 1934, before the Cy-Hawk Trophy was established in 1977. The series halted after 1934 after then University of Iowa Athletic Director and head football coach Ossie Solem would not return calls to reschedule the rivalry; the series was restarted in 1977. Of the 66 games in the series played through 2021, 40 of them have been played in Iowa City while just 28 games have been contested in Ames.

Games in the series are often decided by less than seven points, regardless of the pregame ranking of the teams. Through the 2021 season, Iowa has won the last six contests. The game was canceled in 2020 due to the COVID-19 pandemic, marking the first time since 1976 that the rivalry was not played. 

The 2019 game featured an appearance by ESPN College GameDay, the first time Iowa State had hosted the program. GameDay returned for the 2021 edition, which was the first time the rivalry feature both teams ranked in the AP Top 10.

Surprisingly, Iowa State's home field advantage has not been very advantageous for the Cyclones as they are 8-21 in Cy-Hawk games played in Ames. As of 2022, Iowa State's last victory in Ames came in 2011 and Iowa State has only won three Cy-Hawk games in Ames in the past 20 years. Iowa State has found more success in Iowa City as three of their last four wins have come in Iowa City (occurring in 2022, 2014, and 2012).

References

College football rivalries in the United States
Iowa Hawkeyes football
Iowa State Cyclones football
1894 establishments in Iowa